Ahmed El-Fishawy; (born November 11, 1980) an Egyptian actor and son of recognized Egyptian actor Farouk al-Fishawy.

Career 
His acting debut was with actress Faten Hamama in Wajh al-Qamar TV-Series. At 23 he starred in Afaret El Sayala (Ghosts of Sayala). His first movie was El Hassa El Sab'aa.

Personal life 
El-Fishawy has been married four times, ending with divorce. His secret marriage with Hend El-Hennawi was a media and social scandal, due to his denial of being the father of their child, Lina. The case was closed after the court order of validation of paternity.

On 22 May 2018, he announced his engagement to Nada Kamel. They held a small and private ceremony on the first of May.

In November 2019, a court ruling was issued to annual a decision which banned Lina from traveling.

In January 2020, El-Fishawy was sentenced to one year in prison, due to his failure to provide child support. The ruling included one year of prison, bail of £E 2,000, a fine of £E 500, and compensation of £E 20,000 and £E 50,000 for attorneys and other expenses.

Filmography

Series 
 Wajh al-Qamar 
 El Ama Nour
 Shabab Online
 Hadith Al Sabah wal Masa'
 Afaret El Sayala (Ghosts of Sayala)
 Tamer Wa Shaw'eyyah
 Al-Gama'a (TV series)
 El Tennen (The Dragon)
 Sedna El Sayd
 Bedon Zekr Asma'

Movies 

 El Hassa El Sab'aa
Shabab Ala Hawa
 45 Days
 Waraket Shafra
 Zay El Naharda
 Telk Al Ayam
 18 Days
 678
 Wahed Sefr (1,0)
 Sa'aa w nos
 Hatoly Ragel
Sukkar Mor
Welad Rizk (2015)
 Monkey talks
Sheikh Jackson (2017)
 Gunshot (2018)
 122 (2019)

Songs 
 Participated in "Waraket Shafra" movie song with "Arabian Nights" band.
 A member of «Ghetto Pharoz» rap band.

References

External links 
 .

Egyptian male television actors
1980 births
Living people
[[Category:Egyptian male film 
actors]]
Egyptian film directors
Male actors from Cairo